Ring frei may refer to:

 Ring frei (album), a 2009 album by LaFee
 "Ring frei" (song), a 2008 song by LaFee